BARE in the Woods (or BARE Festival) is an annual, award-winning music festival which has been staged since 2014 at Garryhinch Woods, Portarlington, Co. Laois, Ireland. B.A.R.E stands for Bringing Another Righteous Event.

BARE 2018 is set to take place at Borris House, Co. Carlow on 6 and 7 July 2018.

History
The 2014 festival featured national and international acts, including The Eskies, Phantom, Liza Flume, Corner Boy, New Secret Weapon, Elastic Sleep, Sounds Of System Breakdown, Moscow Metro, and The Vincent(s).

In 2017, B.A.R.E in the Woods won the Best One Day Festival award at the Irish Festival Awards, for the second year running.

References

Music festivals in Ireland